Kevin Glen Kemp (born May 3, 1954) is a Canadian former ice hockey defenceman who played three games in the National Hockey League for the Hartford Whalers during the 1980–81 season.

Playing career
Born in Ottawa, Ontario, Kemp was drafted 138th overall by the Toronto Maple Leafs in the 1974 NHL amateur draft but never played for them, instead he had spells in the United States Hockey League for the Milwaukee Admirals, the Southern Hockey League for the Hampton Gulls, the International Hockey League for the Saginaw Gears and the Central Hockey League for the Oklahoma City Blazers.  He followed that with two full seasons with the Gears in the IHL before moving on the New Brunswick Hawks of the American Hockey League.  He was then claimed in the 1979 NHL Expansion Draft by the Hartford Whalers and went on to have full seasons in the AHL with the Springfield Indians and the Binghamton Whalers but did manage to play three regular season games in the National Hockey League for the Hartford Whalers, going scoreless.  Kemp retired at the end of the season.

Despite never playing for the Ottawa Senators, Kemp is a member of the Senators' Alumni, appearing at events with the alumni including Hockey Day in Whitehorse in 2011.

Career statistics

Regular season and playoffs

References

External links

1954 births
Living people
Binghamton Whalers players
Canadian expatriate ice hockey players in the United States
Canadian ice hockey defencemen
Hampton Gulls (SHL) players
Hartford Whalers players
Ice hockey people from Ottawa
New Brunswick Hawks players
Oklahoma City Blazers (1965–1977) players
Ottawa 67's players
Saginaw Gears players
Springfield Indians players
Toronto Maple Leafs draft picks